Puzeh-ye Kuhbord (also Romanized as Pūzeh-ye Kūhbord) is a village in Dehdasht-e Gharbi Rural District, in the Central District of Kohgiluyeh County, Kohgiluyeh and Boyer-Ahmad Province, Iran. At the 2006 census, its population was 86, in 14 families.

References 

Populated places in Kohgiluyeh County